Nina Antonovna Bocharova (September 24, 1924 – August 31, 2020) was a Soviet/Ukrainian gymnast, who won four medals at the 1952 Summer Olympics. She was born in Suprunivka, Poltava Oblast, Ukrainian SSR, Soviet Union.

Career
Bocharova competed for Budivelnyk, Kyiv (Stroitel, Kiev), debuting at the Nationals in 1948, where she placed fourth on the uneven bars and balance beam. These two were her best events throughout the career. She won the all-around titles at the USSR Championships in 1949 and 1951, with Maria Gorokhovskaya being her main rival. In 1952 Bocharova competed in the 1952 Summer Olympics, the first official Olympics for Soviet athletes participation. Placing 2nd to Gorokhovskaya in the all-around, she won the gold on the beam and contributed to the team's gold. She also earned another silver medal in the team exercise with hand apparatus event. At age 30 she competed in the 1954 World Artistic Gymnastics Championships, winning the gold medal in the team competition, and finished her career afterwards.

In the early 2000s Nina Bocharova still actively participated in sports activities and meetings and was honoured to be the relay originating torchbearer of the 2004 Olympic Torch Relay on Ukrainian territory.

Death
Bocharova died in Rome, Italy, on August 31, 2020, 24 days before her 96th birthday.

Competitive history

References

External links
 Nina Bocharova at Gymn Forum
 
 

1924 births
2020 deaths
People from Poltava Governorate
Soviet female artistic gymnasts
Ukrainian female artistic gymnasts
Olympic gold medalists for the Soviet Union
Olympic silver medalists for the Soviet Union
Olympic gymnasts of the Soviet Union
Gymnasts at the 1952 Summer Olympics
Medalists at the World Artistic Gymnastics Championships
Olympic medalists in gymnastics
Avanhard (sports society) sportspeople
Medalists at the 1952 Summer Olympics
Sportspeople from Poltava Oblast